AS Veti Club is a football club in Matadi, Democratic Republic of Congo.  They play in the Linafoot, the top level of professional football in DR Congo.

Honours
Coupe du Congo
 Runners-up (3): 2001, 2011, 2012

Ligue de Football Bas-Congo (LIFBACO)
 Winners (2): 1994, 2011

Football clubs in the Democratic Republic of the Congo
Matadi